James William Kelly (born 2 May 1957) is an English former footballer. His regular position was as a midfielder. He was born in Carlisle, Cumbria. He played for Manchester United, Chicago Sting, Tulsa Roughnecks, Los Angeles Aztecs, and Toronto Blizzard.

External links
MUFCInfo.com profile
NASLjerseys.com profile
CoD Coach profile

1957 births
Living people
Chicago Sting (NASL) players
English footballers
English expatriate footballers
Los Angeles Aztecs players
Manchester United F.C. players
Tulsa Roughnecks (1978–1984) players
North American Soccer League (1968–1984) players
North American Soccer League (1968–1984) indoor players
Toronto Blizzard (1971–1984) players
Association football midfielders
Expatriate soccer players in Canada
Expatriate soccer players in the United States
English expatriate sportspeople in the United States
English expatriate sportspeople in Canada